P4 Radio Hele Norge AS Norway's leading national, private radio station with 24% national market share, about one million daily listeners and two million weekly.

P4 Radio Hele Norge operates a nationwide public service-licence, with official requirements for news and information. It broadcasts via DAB+ and on the Internet. On 1 November 2006 the company launched an all-rock music station, Bandit, available via internet streaming, and previously also on DAB.

The headquarters is located in Lillehammer, with regional representation and broadcast-studios in Oslo. P4 have previously been represented with studios and offices in Sarpsborg, Bergen, Tromsø, Stavanger, Kristiansand and Trondheim.

Radio Stations

 P4
 NRJ Norway
 P5 Hits
 P6 Rock
 P7 Klem
 P8 Pop
 P9 Retro
 P10 Country
 P11 Bandit

See also
Radio Norge: PFI's main radio competitor and former holder of the Norwegian P4 FM frequencies.

External links 
 P4
 Bandit

Radio stations in Norway
Mass media companies of Norway
Nordic Entertainment Group
Companies based in Lillehammer
Mass media in Lillehammer
Radio stations established in 1994
Companies formerly listed on the Oslo Stock Exchange
1994 establishments in Norway